A progressive scan DVD player is a DVD player that can produce video in a progressive scan format such as 480p (NTSC) or 576p (PAL).  Players which can output resolutions higher than 480p or 576p are often called upconverting DVD players.

Before HDTVs became common, players were sold which could produce 480p or 576p.  TVs with this feature were often in the upper price range of a manufacturer's line.  To utilize this feature, a TV or other display with a progressive scan input was needed. HDTVs usually have a progressive scan input; progressive scan inputs are less common on standard definition TVs (often called SDTVs.)

Some players have a feature called "3:2 pulldown detection" or "inverse telecine" which attempts to better handle the artifacts which result from differing film and video rates in conjunction with interlaced scanning of the film. However most line doublers used in these players are not able to achieve the anticipated inverse telecine functionality. (See Line doubler for details.)

Progressive scan output cannot use connections intended for interlaced video, such as composite video (single RCA terminated cable) and S-Video (Mini-DIN terminated cable).  The following connection methods are common for using progressive scan:
 VGA (analog)
 SCART (using analog RGB-video in PAL areas)
 Component Video (using three cables terminated with RCA connectors)
 DVI or HDMI (Most recent methods, supported by many newer HDTVs)

Consumer electronics
DVD
Film and video technology
Video hardware